Wang's Family is a 2013 South Korean television series starring Oh Hyun-kyung, Lee Tae-ran, Lee Yoon-ji, Jo Sung-ha, Oh Man-seok and Han Joo-wan. It aired on KBS2 from August 31, 2013 to February 16, 2014 on Saturdays and Sundays at 19:55 for 50 episodes.

Plot
Wang Su-bak, the eldest daughter of the Wang family, had married into a wealthy family, but after her husband Go Min-joong goes bankrupt, she and her family have to move back into her parents' home.

Second daughter Ho-bak is also having financial difficulties with her jobless husband Heo Se-dal, while third daughter Gwang-bak suddenly decides to quit her stable job as a teacher to pursue her dream of becoming a writer.

The Wang family must now face a number of challenges in Korean society, such as elitism, discrimination, the power dynamics between husband & wife and between parent & child, and the decision when to marry & have a child.

Cast

Main Cast

Wang Family

Go Family

Heo Family

Choi Family

Extended Cast

Ratings
Episode ratings for KBS2 drama Wang's Family

Sources: TNmS Media Korea, AGB Nielsen Korea

Awards and nominations

International broadcast

It aired in Thailand on PPTV beginning May 9, 2014.

Remake
 This series is remade in Vietnam as Gạo nếp gạo tẻ, currently aired on channel HTV2 (2018).

References

External links
  
 
 

Korean Broadcasting System television dramas
2013 South Korean television series debuts
2014 South Korean television series endings
Korean-language television shows
South Korean romance television series
South Korean comedy television series
Television series by Celltrion Entertainment